Prince Waldemar of Prussia (Friedrich Wilhelm Waldemar von Preußen) (Berlin, 2 August 1817 – Münster, 17 February 1849) was a son of Prince Wilhelm of Prussia and Landgravine Marie Anna of Hesse-Homburg. He was a Major general in the Prussian Army and a traveller.

Biography
Waldemar was born in Berlin, the son of Prince William, the youngest brother of King Frederick William III.
Of his 4 brothers, only Prince Adalbert survived his childhood. His youngest sister Marie was Queen of Bavaria.

As a young man, Waldemar entered the Prussian army and raised through the ranks to become a Colonel in 1844.  

His urge to see distant lands led him to the Mediterranean, to South America and in 1844 to India, where he traveled to the Himalayas via Calcutta and Hindustan. His journey came to an end with the First Anglo-Sikh War. He witnessed the first day of the Battle of Ferozeshah (21/22 December 1845), but when his companion and childhood friend Werner Hoffmeister was fatally hit by a bullet, British commander Hugh Gough urged Prince Waldemar to return home. 

Back in Germany he became commander of the 13th Cavalry Brigade in Münster on 9 March 1848. But weakened by the hardships of the journey and the Indian climate, he died there on 17 February 1849.

Prince Waldemar maintained a travelogue during his journeys composed of his diaries, sketches of Egypt, Iraq, India, Calcutta, Delhi, Lahore, Bombay, Nepal, and other locations. Zur Erinnerung an die Reise des Prinzen Waldemar von Preußen nach Indien 1844-1846, translated In Memory of the Journey of Prince Waldemar of Prussia to India in the Years 1844-1946, was printed posthumously in two volumes. Prince Waldemar’s diary depicts sacred places, people, and painted lithographs of the sketches. Pastoral Landscapes of the Middle Eastern, Indian, and South Asian countryside, such as the Sri Dalada Maligawa, Temple of the Tooth. 

Published works of the expedition included writings and sketches of Werner Hoffmeister and others as well, additional record of the journey can be found in Briefe aus Indien. Von Dr. W. Hoffmeister, Arzt im Gefolge Sr. Königl, Hoheit des Prinzen Waldemar von Preußen

Honours
He received the following orders and decorations:

Ancestry

References

Sources
ADB
Waldemarstraße

1817 births
1849 deaths
People from the Province of Brandenburg
House of Hohenzollern
Prussian princes
Recipients of the Pour le Mérite (military class)
Honorary Knights Grand Cross of the Order of the Bath